Sabarkantha district is one of the 33 districts of Gujarat state of India and is located in the northeastern part of the state. The administrative headquarters of the district are located in Himatnagar.

At a glance 
General outline of the district: 

 Geographical Location: 23.030 to 24.30 N latitude and 72.43 to 73.39 E. longitude
 Climate: Minimum temperature of 9 o C in winter, maximum temperature of 49 o C in summer, generally temperate climate.
 Soil: White, black, rocky, stony, sandy, hilly and rocky.
 Rivers: Sabarmati , Khari , Meshvo , Hathmati , Harnao , Vatrak , Mazam River
 Crops: Paddy , millet , cotton , wheat , sorghum , tobacco , groundnut , castor , raido , vegetable crops, tomatoes , sorghum, cauliflower and cauliflower.
 Total villages: 1,389
 Number of Gram Panchayats: Gram Panchayat - 714, Group Gram Panchayat - 325
 Municipality: 06
 National Highway No. 48 passes through here.

Geography

Sabarkantha District is bounded by Rajasthan state to the north and northeast, Banaskantha district and Mehsana district to the west, Gandhinagar district to the south and Aravalli district to the southeast.

It is spread across an area of 5390 km2. It has a gender ratio of 950 females per 1000 men, and the literacy rate for the district is 76.6%.

History
During the Western Satrap rule, the region was known as Shwabhra. The region was under the rule of Satrap Rudradama in 150 A.D. as indicated in Ashoka's Major Rock Edicts at Junagadh. The river of the region was originally named Shwabhravati and is now known as the Sabarmati River. The region is also named in auxiliary text Gaṇapāṭha of Pāṇini's grammar work, Aṣṭādhyāyī.

During the British Raj Vijaynagar in Sabarkantha district was the capital of Vijaynagar State or Pol State, one of the princely states of the Mahi Kantha Agency.

The present-day district of Sabarkantha was formed in 1949 through the merger of 29 princely states and some parts of the British-governed Ahmedabad district. When the erstwhile Bombay state was bifurcated in 1960, Sabarkantha became a part of the newly-formed Gujarat.

Economy
In 2006 the Ministry of Panchayati Raj named Sabarkantha one of the country's 250 most backward districts (out of a total of 640). It is one of the six districts in Gujarat currently receiving funds from the Backward Regions Grant Fund Programme (BRGF).

Divisions
Sabarkantha district has 8 talukas:

 Himatnagar
 Idar
 Prantij
 Talod
 Khedbrahma
 Poshina
 Vadali
 Vijaynagar

Demographics
According to the 2011 census Sabarkantha district has a population of 2,428,589, roughly equal to the nation of Kuwait or the US state of New Mexico. This gives it a ranking of 183rd in India (out of a total of 640). Its population growth rate over the decade 2001-2011 was 16.56%. Sabarkantha has a sex ratio of 950 females for every 1000 males, and a literacy rate of 76.6%.

The residual district had a population of 1,388,671, of which 237,158 (17.08%) lived in urban areas. Residual Sabarkantha district had a sex ratio of 951 females per 1000 males. Scheduled Castes and Scheduled Tribes made up 125,462 (9.03%) and 328,243 (23.64%) of the population respectively.

Hindus are 1,285,218, Muslims are 90,027 and Jains are 9,990.

Language

At the time of the 2011 Census of India, 97.85% of the population in the district spoke Gujarati and 1.63% Hindi as their first language.

Politics
  

|}

Forts
Idario Gadh - Ilva Durga (ancient fort) – Idar is an ancient fort, known as 'Ilva Durga' and finds mentioned in Mahabharat and in the travelogue of the Rathore Rajputs in the Mahi Kantha agency at the time of British Raj. It is a classic example of a naturally protected hill fort, located at the southern edge of the Aravalli range. At the foothill, lay the ruins of an old palace, a fine specimen of architecture in stone with delicately carved balconies. The entry to Idar town is through a three storeyed clock tower cum entrance gate, with a huge arch and semi circular dome at the top. The road, with a colourful bazaar on both sides, leads to the tower and ends at the foothills of Idar fort.

Heritage sites

Vijay Villas Vijaynagar 
Vijay Villas Vijaynagar is nested on the foothills of the aravali ranges and is on the edge of among the few dense forests left in Gujarat in the Sabarkantha district which is on the border of Gujarat and Rajasthan. It is a heaven for nature and wild life admirers.

Darbargadh 
About 18 km from Ambaji in Sabarkantha district, Poshina takes one back to the simple beauty of traditional village life, populated by a captivating mélange of colorful tribal communities of the Garasias, Bhils and the pastoral Rabaris. Poshina is home to a tribal shrine where you find the staggering scene of thousands of terracotta horses standing in rows as offerings to the local goddess. Nearby villages have similar horses carved in reverence to her divinity. A visit to the homes of the potters who make these striking horses is an excellent glimpse into tribal culture.

In Poshina you find the Darbargadh Poshina, once a palace, and now a welcoming heritage hotel, with huge gateways, a massive dome, numerous pillars and arches, a pleasant courtyard, gardens, lawns and terraces, owned by the descendants of the Chalukyas, whose empire spread through much of Gujarat and Central India in the 12th century. You also find old Jain sandstone temples of Parshvanath and Neminath and an old Shiva temple.

Sabarkantha district is host to the famous Chitra Vichitra Fair in Gunbhakhari village, a couple of weeks after Holi.

Polo forest 

Polo forest is spread across 400 square KM, located near Abhapur village in Vijaynagar taluka of Gujarat. Polo forest is surrounded by beautiful hills from where the Harnav River is crossing and spread across the forest, ancient Shiv temple, Jain temple and other heritage site located in nearby areas, Every year, Gujarat government celebrate Polo festival by organizing well-planned travel events which includes adventure activities, cycling, camping.

Notable people
 Umashankar Joshi (1911–1988), writer and scholar, born in Bamna (now Aravalli district).
 Rashid Patel, Indian cricketer.
 Zohraben Chavda (1923–1997), Gandhian social reformer and member of the 3rd Loksabha from Banaskantha.
Manoj Joshi, actor and comedian, born in Himmatnagar.
Praful Khoda Patel, politician and administrator of Diu, Daman and Dadra Nagar Haveli.

See also
 Punsari
 Harsol

References

External links

 Official website
 Collectorate website
 
 Bhiloda site

 
Districts of Gujarat